No Selfish Heart is the first album by Rick Redbeard, the solo recording pseudonym of Scottish musician Rick Anthony. It was released on 28 January 2013 through Chemikal Underground Records to critical acclaim.

It was self-recorded by Anthony in Aberdeenshire, Glasgow and the Bernese Oberland in the first half of 2012. It is composed of songs written by Anthony between 2004 and 2012 as well as a version of the traditional Scottish folk song Kelvin Grove and one older home-recording from 2007, the single Now We're Dancing.

Themes
The album deals primarily with themes of nature, love, sex, death, memory, nostalgia and the passage of time and has a stripped back sound and emphasis on acoustic instrumentation that is markedly different from Anthony's prior work with The Phantom Band.

Influences
Critics noted the influence on the album of iconic artists such as Leonard Cohen, Will Oldham, Bill Callahan, Jason Molina, Jim Reid (folk musician), Alasdair Roberts and Neil Young as well as the dark, sparse Southern gothic prose of Cormac McCarthy and the surreal fantasy of Alasdair Gray. Anthony has also spoken of the influence that landscape and nature has on his writing, specifically the scenery of his native Aberdeenshire and the mountains of the Bernese Alps.

Track listing
 "Clocks" - 2.19
 "Old Blue" - 4.06
 "Any Way I Can" - 5.21
 "A Greater Brave" - 5.08
 "We All Float" - 3.03
 "Kelvin Grove" - 5.52
 "Now We're Dancing" - 4.02
 "Cold As Clay (The Grave)" - 4.07
 "Wildlove" - 3.11
 "No Selfish Heart" - 5.59

Personnel
 Rick Anthony - vocals, guitar, piano, percussion, melodica, xylophone, bass
 Josephine Anthony - backing vocals and photography
 Angus Ramsay - violin
 Eileen Ramsay - layout, design and photography
 Oran Wishart - layout and design
 Kenny MacLeod - mastering

References

Rick Anthony albums
2013 albums
Chemikal Underground albums